Malakal  is a county in the Upper Nile State. Previously, it was a part of Upper Nile, South Sudan.

Administrative divisions
Malakal county is divided into 6 Payams
 Central Malakal
 Eastern Malakal
 Northern Malakal
 Southern Malakal
 Lelo
 Ogot

References

Upper Nile (state)
Counties of South Sudan